Olivia Broadfield (born 7 June 1981) is an English singer and songwriter.

She signed publishing deals with pigFACTORY and Lionsgate in 2007 and released her debut album Eyes Wide Open the same year.

Her songs have frequently been played on TV and in films, with songs in One Tree Hill, The Hills, The Real World, The Dead Zone, Wildfire, A Shot at Love, Making His Band, Ghost Whisperer,  The Vampire Diaries and The Split.

In 2007, Broadfield sang "It's a Long Way", by Caetano Veloso, for the soundtrack of Brazilian film Meu Nome Não é Johnny.

Broadfield gained the notice of blogger Perez Hilton and TV star Jessica Simpson. She signed a record deal with U.S.-based Vagrant Records in February 2009. Her debut album, Eyes Wide Open, was re-released in the U.S. on 14 July 2009. The song "Don't Cry" was released as a single.

In 2011, Broadfield signed a publishing deal with Sony/ATV and her second album, This Beautiful War, was released. Songs from the album featured on Grey's Anatomy, 90210, Arrow, The Nine Lives of Chloe King, The Vampire Diaries and Chasing Life. Her third album, Paper Dolls (2013), was released through Pledge Music and was heard on Vampire Diaries, About A Boy, Switched at Birth and The Night Shift.

In 2014, Broadfield co-wrote "Bird" with Billie Marten. In 2015, the song was released and was played on BBC Radio 1 and Radio 2, featured as Jo Whiley's 'New Favourite Thing' and Annie Mac's 'Tune of the Week'; it also got the attention of Ed Sheeran who declared it "stunning" to his 20 million followers.

In 2015, Broadfield released her album Jumberlack and signed a deal with Secretly Canadian.

In 2020, Broadfield worked on the BBC One series The Split, writing songs for each of the six episodes.

References

External links

1981 births
Living people
English women singer-songwriters
People from Coventry
21st-century English women singers
21st-century English singers